Carwyn Rees James (2 November 1929 – 10 January 1983) was a Welsh rugby union player and coach. He won two Welsh international caps but is most famous for his coaching achievements with Llanelli, the 1971 British Lions and the Barbarians, with all of whom he beat the All Blacks.

Early life
James was born in 1929, the son of a coalminer, in Cefneithin in the Gwendraeth Valley.

Teaching, navy, espionage
James worked as a Welsh teacher by profession and later a lecturer at Trinity College, Carmarthen. He also served in the navy, and may have done spying work, although was a pacifist later in life.

Rugby playing
James played fly-half for Llanelli, playing his first game while still at Gwendraeth School. He was capped for Wales twice in 1958, the second time at centre, but would probably have gained more caps had he not been in competition with Cliff Morgan for the fly-half spot.

Rugby coaching
James gained distinction as a coach with Llanelli.

James was coach of the 1971 British and Irish Lions tour to New Zealand, the only Lions side ever to win a series against the All Blacks.

James then continued to coach Llanelli. He coached them to the famous victory over the All Blacks at Stradey Park, Llanelli, in 1972. He then coached them to four Welsh Cups between 1973 and 1976.

James also coached the Barbarians to victory over the All Blacks in 1973, including being credited with man management to stimulate Phil Bennett to make his famous sidestepping run that day.

He then coached in Italy, at Rugby Rovigo, from 1977 to 1980, winning a title.

James never coached the Welsh national side, largely because of his belief that the coach should chair the selectors' meetings and be responsible for choosing the other selectors. At one stage he applied for the role but then withdrew his application.

Coaching approach
James coaching style was said to involve quiet words with players and half-suggestions rather than orders. He was a strong believer in attacking rugby, with the attitude that if a team had possession of the ball it should be able to attack, regardless of the position on the field.

Politics
James was a nationalist and stood as Plaid Cymru candidate in Llanelli in the 1970 General Election. He was an opponent of apartheid and during the controversial 1969/70 Springbok tour he prepared the Llanelli team but stayed in the dressing room as a protest. He was a pacifist in his later years.

Rugby media work
In his later years he became a noted broadcaster on the game in Wales.

Personal life
James was very interested in literature. He never married, and is believed by many to have struggled with loneliness and possibly been homosexual.

Death
Towards the end of his life James' personal health management was not good, including alcohol and cigarette consumption.
In January 1983, 53-year-old James was on a private visit to the Netherlands and staying alone at the Hotel Krasnapolsky in Dam Square, Amsterdam. The Western Mail reported that his body was discovered in the bath of his hotel suite, having lain there for some days. Police said he had died of a heart attack and there were no suspicious circumstances.

Legacy
The sports building of Aberystwyth University is named after him, as is the playing field at Cefneithin RFC.

Due to his coaching in Italy, an international tournament, called "Carwyn James Easter Trophy", is held in Pieve di Cento (Bologna). The 12th edition was in 2016. The trophy is for Under 15s sides and has been arranged with the help of Carwyn's nephew, Llyr James.

Bibliography

References

External links

 

 Outside Half BBC documentary about Carwyn James

1929 births
1983 deaths
Rugby union players from Carmarthenshire
Welsh educators
Welsh rugby union players
Rugby union fly-halves
Welsh rugby union coaches
Alumni of Aberystwyth University
World Rugby Hall of Fame inductees
People associated with Trinity University College
British & Irish Lions coaches
Wales international rugby union players
Llanelli RFC players
Llanelli RFC coaches
London Welsh RFC players
Barbarian F.C. players
Devonport Services R.F.C. players
Welsh nationalists